Now or Never is the debut extended play released by South Korean band CNBLUE on August 19, 2009. It is the only CNBLUE release to feature Kwon Kwang-jin, who left 1 month later due to personal reasons.

Track list
Now or Never
Let's Go Crazy
Love Revolution
Just Please
Teardrops in the Rain

References

External links

Now or Never Track list
 http://www.jpopasia.com/group/cnblue/lyrics/now-or-never::80.html

2009 EPs
CNBLUE EPs